The 2013–14 Washington Capitals season was the 40th season for the National Hockey League franchise that was established on June 11, 1974. The Capitals failed to make the playoffs for the first time since the 2006–07 season, ending their six season playoff streak. During this season, the Capitals also set the current NHL record for total shootouts in a season with 21 - out of a possible 82 games.

Standings

Schedule and results

Pre-season

Regular season

Player statistics
Final stats
Skaters

Goaltenders

†Denotes player spent time with another team before joining the Capitals. Stats reflect time with the Capitals only.
‡Denotes player was traded mid-season. Stats reflect time with the Capitals only.
Bold/italics denotes franchise record.

Transactions
The Capitals have been involved in the following transactions during the 2013–14 season.

Trades

Free agents acquired

Free agents lost

Claimed via waivers

Lost via waivers

Player signings

Draft picks

Washington Capitals' picks at the 2013 NHL Entry Draft, which was held in Newark, New Jersey on June 30, 2013.

Draft notes
 The Chicago Blackhawks' second-round pick went to the Washington Capitals as the result of a trade on June 30, 2013, that sent Washington's third and fourth-round picks in 2013 (84th and 114th overall) and Calgary's fifth-round pick in 2013 (127th overall) to Winnipeg in exchange for this pick.     Winnipeg previously acquired this pick as the result of a trade on June 30, 2013 that sent Johnny Oduya to Chicago in exchange for Chicago's third-round pick in 2013 and this pick.
 The Washington Capitals' third-round pick went to the Winnipeg Jets as the result of a trade on June 30, 2013, that sent Chicago's second-round pick in 2013 (61st overall) to Washington in exchange for a fourth-round pick in 2013 (114th overall), Calgary's fifth-round pick in 2013 (127th overall) and this pick.
 The Washington Capitals' fourth-round pick went to the Winnipeg Jets as the result of a trade on June 30, 2013, that sent Chicago's second-round pick in 2013 (61st overall) to Washington in exchange for a third-round pick in 2013 (84th overall), Calgary's fifth-round pick in 2013 (127th overall) and this pick.
 The Calgary Flames' fifth-round pick went to the Winnipeg Jets as the result of a trade on June 30, 2013, that sent Chicago's second-round pick in 2013 (61st overall) to Washington in exchange for a third and fourth-round pick in 2013 (84th and 114th overall) and this pick.     Washington previously acquired this pick as the result of a trade on June 27, 2012, that sent Dennis Wideman to Calgary in exchange for Jordan Henry and this pick.

References

Washington Capitals seasons
Washington Capitals season, 2013-14
Washington Capitals
Washington Capitals
Was